Steffi Graf was the defending champion and won in the final 6–1, 6–4 against Kimiko Date.

Seeds
A champion seed is indicated in bold text while text in italics indicates the round in which that seed was eliminated. All thirty-three seeds received a bye to the second round.

  Arantxa Sánchez Vicario (third round)
  Steffi Graf (champion)
  Jana Novotná (semifinals)
  Lindsay Davenport (fourth round)
  Gabriela Sabatini (semifinals)
  Natasha Zvereva (quarterfinals)
  Kimiko Date (final)
  Anke Huber (quarterfinals)
 n/a
  Naoko Sawamatsu (fourth round)
  Amy Frazier (second round)
  Lori McNeil (second round)
  Judith Wiesner (fourth round)
  Amanda Coetzer (fourth round)
  Inés Gorrochategui (fourth round)
 n/a
  Zina Garrison-Jackson (third round)
  Karina Habšudová (third round)
  Yayuk Basuki (third round)
  Lisa Raymond (fourth round)
  Irina Spîrlea (third round)
  Gigi Fernández (second round)
  Nathalie Tauziat (second round)
  Sabine Appelmans (second round)
  Marianne Werdel-Witmeyer (quarterfinals)
  Katerina Maleeva (second round)
  Miriam Oremans (third round)
  Barbara Rittner (second round)
  Larisa Neiland (fourth round)
  Angélica Gavaldón (third round)
  Kyōko Nagatsuka (second round)
  Anna Smashnova (third round)
  Shi-Ting Wang (third round)

Draw

Finals

Top half

Section 1

Section 2

Section 3

Section 4

Bottom half

Section 5

Section 6

Section 7

Section 8

References
 1995 Lipton Championships Draw

Women's Singles
Lipton Championships - Women's Singles